Greencourt is a hamlet in central Alberta, Canada within Lac Ste. Anne County.

The community takes its name from Greencourt, England.

History 
In 1908, when the railway reached Junkins, Alberta (later Wildwood) a trail was cut from Junkins to Green Court as a route for homesteaders and supplies.

Demographics 
The population of Green Court according to the 2008 municipal census conducted by Lac Ste. Anne County is 51.

See also 
List of communities in Alberta
List of hamlets in Alberta

References 

Hamlets in Alberta
Lac Ste. Anne County